World Food Council (WFC) was a United Nations organization established by the UN General Assembly in December 1974 by recommendation of the World Food Conference. Its headquarters was in Rome, Italy. WFC's goal was to serve as coordinating body for national ministries of agriculture to help reduce malnutrition and hunger. WFC was officially suspended in 1993. WFC is one of very few (if not the only) UN organization which has been suspended. WFC's functions were absorbed by the Food and Agriculture Organization of the United Nations and the World Food Programme.

References
 http://www.nationsencyclopedia.com/United-Nations/Economic-and-Social-Development-WORLD-FOOD-COUNCIL-WFC.html
 http://wwwa.britannica.com/eb/article-9001517

United Nations General Assembly subsidiary organs
Hunger relief organizations
Organisations based in Rome
Organizations established in 1974
Organizations disestablished in 1993